Asociación Alumni, usually just Alumni, is an Argentine rugby union club located in Tortuguitas, Greater Buenos Aires. The senior squad currently competes at Top 12, the first division of the Unión de Rugby de Buenos Aires league system.

The club has ties with former football club Alumni because both were established by Buenos Aires English High School students.

History

Background

The first club with the name "Alumni" played association football, having been found in 1898 by students of Buenos Aires English High School (BAEHS) along with director Alexander Watson Hutton. Originally under the name "English High School A.C.", the team would be later obliged by the Association to change its name, therefore "Alumni" was chosen, following a proposal by Carlos Bowers, a former student of the school.

Alumni was the most successful team during the first years of Argentine football, winning 10 of 14 league championships contested. Alumni is still considered the first great football team in the country. Alumni was reorganised in 1908, "in order to encourage people to practise all kind of sports, specially football". This was the last try to develop itself as a sports club rather than just a football team, such as Lomas, Belgrano and Quilmes had successfully done in the past, but the efforts were not enough. Alumni played its last game in 1911 and was definitely dissolved on April 24, 1913.

Rebirth through rugby
In 1951, two guards of the BAEHS, Daniel Ginhson (also a former player of Buenos Aires F.C.) and Guillermo Cubelli, supported by the school's alumni and fathers of the students, they decided to establish a club focused on rugby union exclusively. Former players still alive of Alumni football club and descendants of other players already dead gave their permission to use the name "Alumni".

On December 13, in a meeting presided by Carlos Bowers himself (who had proposed the name "Alumni" to the original football team 50 years before), the club was officially established under the name "Asociación Juvenil Alumni", also adopting the same colors as its predecessor.

The team achieved good results and in 1960 the club presented a team that won the third division of the Buenos Aires league, reaching the second division. Since then, Alumni has played at the highest level of Argentine rugby and its rivalry with Belgrano Athletic Club is one of the fiercest local derbies in Buenos Aires. Alumni would later climb up to first division winning 5 titles: 4 consecutive between 1989 and 1992, and the other in 2001.

In 2002, Alumni won its first Nacional de Clubes title, defeating Jockey Club de Rosario 23–21 in the final.

Players

Current roster
As of January 2018:

 Federico Lucca
 Gaspar Baldunciel
 Guido Cambareri
 Iñaki Etchegaray
 Bernardo Quaranta
 Tobias Moyano
 Mariano Romanini
 Santiago Montagner
 Tomas Passerotti
 Lucas Frana
 Luca Sabato
 Franco Batezzatti
 Franco Sabato
 Rafael Desanto
 Nito Provenzano
 Tomas Bivort
 Juan.P Ceraso
 Santiago Alduncin
 Juan.P Anderson
 Lucas Magnasco
 Joaquin Diaz Luzzi
 Felipe Martignone
 Tomas Corneille

Honours
Nacional de Clubes (1): 2002
Torneo de la URBA (6): 1989, 1990, 1991, 1992, 2001, 2018

References

External links

 

Rugby clubs established in 1951
A
1951 establishments in Argentina